Kathleen Hughes-Hallett (5 April 1918 – 3 August 2002) was a Canadian fencer. She competed in the  women's individual foil event at the 1936 Summer Olympics.

References

1918 births
2002 deaths
Canadian female fencers
Olympic fencers of Canada
Fencers at the 1936 Summer Olympics
Sportspeople from London
English emigrants to Canada
20th-century Canadian women